Pachystigma was a genus of flowering plants in the family Rubiaceae but is no longer recognized. In 2005, it was sunk into synonymy with Vangueria, based on a phylogenetic study of DNA sequences.

References

External links
 World Checklist of Rubiaceae

Historically recognized Rubiaceae genera
Vanguerieae